The 38th edition of the annual Clásico RCN, a bicycle stage race, was held from August 14 to August 23, 1998, in Colombia. The race with an UCI rate of 2.4 started in Barrancabermeja and finished in Bogotá with an individual time trial. RCN stands for "Radio Cadena Nacional" – one of the oldest and largest radio networks in the nation. There were a total of 95 competitors from 13 teams, with 81 cyclists actually finishing the stage race.

Stages

1998-08-14: Barrancabermeja (6.8 km)

1998-08-15: Barrancabermeja — Puerto Boyacá (228 km)

1998-08-16: Puerto Berrio — Bello (180 km)

1998-08-17: Sabaneta — Jardín (124 km)

1998-08-18: Jardín — Chinchiná (216.6 km)

1998-08-19: Roldanillo — Buenaventura (208 km)

1998-08-20: Buenaventura — Pradera (187 km)

1998-08-21: Guacarí — Armenia (137 km)

1998-08-22: Armenia — Espinal (151 km)

1998-08-23: Palacio Presidencial, Bogotá — Alto de Patios, Bogotá (22.1 km)

Final classification

See also 
 1998 Vuelta a Colombia

References 
 cyclingnews

Clásico RCN
Clasico RCN
Clasico RCN